Manoj Das (27 February 1934 – 27 April 2021) was an Indian author who wrote in Odia and English. In 2000, Manoj Das was awarded the Saraswati Samman. He was awarded Padma Shri in 2001, the fourth-highest Civilian Award in India, Padma Bhusan in 2020, and  the third-highest Civilian Award in India for his contribution to the field of Literature & Education.

Kendra Sahitya Akademi has bestowed its highest award (also India's highest literary award) i.e Sahitya Akademi Award Fellowship.

In 1971, his research in the archives of London and Edinburgh brought to light some of the little-known facts of India's freedom struggle in the first decade of the twentieth century led by Sri Aurobindo for which he received the first Sri Aurobindo Puraskar (Kolkata).

His deeper quest led him to mysticism and he was an inmate of Sri Aurobindo Ashram in Puducherry since 1963 where he taught English Literature and the Philosophy of Sri Aurobindo at the Sri Aurobindo International University.

Early life
Das was born in the small coastal village, Balasore of odisha. His father, Madhusudan Das, worked under British Government.  He had started writing early. His first work a book of poetry in Odia, Satavdira Artanada was published in 1949 when he was in high school. He launched a literary  magazine, Diganta  in 1950. He graduated high school in 1951. His first collection of short stories Samudrara Kshyudha (Hunger of Sea) was in that year. 
He was active in student politics while studying BA in Cuttack College. He was a youth leader with radical views in his college days, and spent a year in jail for his revolutionary activities. In 1959 he was a delegate to the Afro-Asian students' conference at Bandung, Indonesia. He did not complete his degree in Cuttack. He ultimately finished his graduation from Samanta Chandra Shekhar College, Puri in 1955. During his college years, he kept on writing and published a novel  Jeebanara Swada, a collection of short stories  Vishakanyar Kahani and a collection of poems Padadhawani. After graduating with a degree in English literature, he got a post-graduate degree in English literature from Ravenshaw college. After a short stint as a lecturer at Christ College (Cuttack), he joined Sri Aurobindo Ashram at Puducherry. Since 1963, he has been professor of English Literature at Sri Aurobindo International Centre of Education, Puducherry.

He cited Fakir Mohan Senapati, Vyasa, and Valmiki as early influences.

As editor and columnist
Das edited a cultural magazine, The Heritage, published from Chennai in 1985-1989. The magazine is no longer in circulation.

He wrote columns on quest for finding eternal truth in common lives in India’s national dailies like The Times of India, The Hindustan Times, The Hindu and The Statesman.

Creative writing and story-telling
Das is perhaps the foremost bilingual Odia writer and a master of dramatic expression both in his English and Odia short stories and novels. Das has been compared to Vishnu Sharma, in modern Odia literature for his magnificent style and efficient use of words and for the fact that, he is one of the best story-tellers in India in modern times. Over the years many research scholars have done their doctoral thesis on the works of Manoj Das, P. Raja being the first scholar to do so.

National and international positions

Among the other important positions that Das held were, Member, General Council, Sahitya Akademi, New Delhi 1998–2002, and Author-consultant, Ministry of Education, Government of Singapore, 1983–85. He was the leader of the Indian delegation of writers to China (1999).

Awards

 Odisha Sahitya Academy Award, 1965 and 1987
 Kendra Sahitya Academy Award, 1972
 Sarala Award, 1981
 Vishuba Award, 1986
 Sahitya Bharati Award, 1995
 Saraswati Samman, 2000;
 Orissa State Film Award for Best Story 2001
 Padma Shri, 2001
Padma Bhushan. 2020
  Sahitya Akademi Fellowship, 2006
 Atibadi Jagannath Das award, 2007
NTR Literary Award, 2013
 Amritakeerti Puraskar, 2013
Veda Vyas Samman
Mystic Kalinga Literary Award (2020)

Selected works

Novels
 The Escapist, 2001
 Tandralokara Prahari, 2000
 Aakashra Isara, 1997
 Amruta Phala, 1996 (Saraswati Samman)
 A Tiger at Twilight, 1991
 Bulldozers and Fables and Fantasies for Adults, (1990)
 Cyclones, 1987
 Prabhanjana
 Godhulira Bagha
 Kanaka-Upatyakara Kahani
  Amruta phala
 Sesha tantrikara sandhanare

Short Story Collections
 Upakatha Sataka
 Abu Purusha
 Sesa Basantara Chithi, 1966
 Manoj Dasanka Katha O Kahani, 1971
 Dhumabha Diganta O Anyana Kahani, 1971
 The Crocodile's Lady: A Collection of Stories, 1975
 Manoj-pancha-bimsati, 1977
 The Submerged Valley and Other Stories, 1986
 Farewell to a Ghost: Short Stories and a Novelette, 1994
 Legend of the Golden Valley, 1996
 Samudra-kulara Eka Grama (Balya Smruti), 1996
 Aranyaka; (adapted to Aranyaka, 1994)
 Bhinna Manisha O Anyana Kahani
 Abupurusha O Anyana Kahani
 Lakshmira Abhisara
 Abolakara Kahani
 Aranya Ullasha
 Selected Fiction,
 Chasing the Rainbow : growing up in an Indian village, 2004

Travelogue
 Keta Diganta (Part I)
 Keta Diganta (Part -II)
 Antaranga Bharata (Part I) (My Little India)
 Antaranga Bharata (Part II)
 Dura-durantara
 Adura Bidesh – 2004

Poetry
 Tuma Gaan O Anyanya Kabita, 1992
 Kabita Utkala

History & Culture
 Bharatara Aitihya: Shateka Prashnara Uttara,1999
 Manoj Das Paribesita Upakatha Shataka (Tales Told by Mystics), 2002
 Mahakalara Prahelika O Anyana Jijnansa, 2006
 Jibana Jijnasa o Smaraika Stabaka
 Prajna Pradeepika

Commentary

Graham Greene once said, "I have read the stories of Manoj Das with great pleasure. He will certainly take a place on my shelves besides the stories of Narayan. I imagine Odisha is far from Malgudi, but there is the same quality in his stories with perhaps an added mystery."

See also
 List of Indian writers

Notes

References
 "Manoj Das – Oriya Writer: The South Asian Literary Recordings Project" Library of Congress, New Delhi Office; loc.gov
 Raja, P. (1993) Many worlds of Manoj [sic] Das B.R. Pub. Corp, New Delhi, ;

External links
 Official Website:worldofmanojdas.in
 facenfacts.com: Face to Face with Manoj Das
On the Crest of the Horizon:Manoj Das" a film by Dr Prafulla Mohanty

Recipients of the Padma Bhushan in literature & education
1934 births
2021 deaths
Writers from Odisha
People from Balasore district
Recipients of the Saraswati Samman Award
Recipients of the Sahitya Akademi Fellowship
Recipients of the Sahitya Akademi Award in Odia
Recipients of the Padma Shri in literature & education
Recipients of the Atibadi Jagannath Das Award
Odia-language writers
Odia short story writers
Odia novelists
Novelists from Odisha
Indian Hindus
20th-century Indian novelists
20th-century Indian short story writers
20th-century Indian poets
Indian travel writers
Indian historical fiction writers
Recipients of the Odisha Sahitya Akademi Award